Sai Kumar, also credited as Saikumar, is an Indian actor who appears in Malayalam films. He is the son of Malayalam actor late Kottarakkara Sreedharan Nair. He appears in both positive and negative roles. He notably plays the hero role in Ramji Rao Speaking, and the villain in Makkal Mahatmyam.

Personal life

Sai Kumar is the son of actor Kottarakkara Sreedharan Nair and Vijayalakshmi Amma. He has seven sisters, five elder and two younger. Actress Shobha Mohan is his elder sister and actor Vinu Mohan  and Anu Mohan are his nephews. He was first married to Prasanna Kumari, but their marriage collapsed. They have a daughter named Vaishnavi from this marriage. He later married actress Bindu Panicker.

Career 

Sai Kumar started his career in theatre. He was offered the lead role in the film Swathi Thirunal (film), but it was later done by Anant Nag. He made his debut in the blockbuster Ramji Rao Speaking (1989). It was directed by two debutantes, Siddique and Lal (Siddique-Lal), and had debutant actors Sai Kumar and Rekha in the lead. Sai Kumar debuted in cinema in the 1977 film Vidarunna Mottukal as a child artist. He started his career with comedy roles, and gradually moved to character roles. He won the Kerala State Film Award for Second Best Actor for his performance in the 2007 film Anandabhairavi.

The success of the film helped him to earn a lot of opportunities in the next few years. He has done leading roles in a few films such as Sauhradam, Thudarkkatha, Khoshayathra, Anantha Vrithantham, and Thooval Sparsam. But in that age of comedy, he could not make an impact as a hero, while Mukesh, Jagadeesh and Siddique were cast in low-budget movies. Sai Kumar remained active in the industry with supporting, character and negative roles in films including In Harihar Nagar, Saandram, Makkal Mahalmyam, Griha Pravesam and Ayushkalam. The sequel to Ramji Rao Speaking; Mannar Mathai Speaking was a blockbuster of 1995. This time Mukesh played the lead role. His villain role in Mammootty's 1996 blockbuster Hitler was noted. This earned him the reputation of acting the intelligent villain. Sai Kumar's real talent was shown once again in the year 2004 in the film Sethuramayyar CBI. He wisely recreated the sound modulation and mannerisms of actor Sukumaran, because the character which Sai Kumar had done was the son of "Inspector Devadas" in the film Oru CBI Diary Kurippu.

Sai Kumar's golden period started in the late 1990s. He was cast in the super hit Aaraam Thampuran by Shaji Kailas where he played the close friend of hero acted by the Malayalam film star Mohanlal. Then he became the inevitable ingredient of all the superstar movies. He played villain to Mohanlal in Narasimham (2000), Thandavam (2001) and Chathurangam (2001). His prominence was evident from the posters of Thandavam, where his pictures were printed the same size as Mohanlal's. In movies such as Valliettan and Vesham he played villain to Mammootty. In the Dileep movie Kunjikkoonan (2002), he appeared in a completely different get-up of a cruel Goonda called Keeri Vasu, which was much acclaimed.

2005 was a very good year for Sai Kumar in which he acted in Rajamanikyam, Mammootty's mega-hit where he played an older man. This made the directors rethink his range of characters. In Suresh Gopi's comeback film Bharathchandran I.P.S., he played the villain. He described the role as an anti-hero, not a villain, since he leads the story in the first 45 minutes until Suresh Gopi appears. He also played the supporting role as DYSP Pothen in the Suresh Gopi hit The Tiger.

He lent his voice for Sathyaraj in Aagathan and also dubbed for Thiagarajan in Thilakkam.

In 2007, he won accolades for his performance as a Kathakali artist and the father of a highly talented but ailing son in Anandabhairavi. Director Vinayan described him as talented as Mohanlal, which is the best compliment for his acting abilities.

Awards

2006 — Asianet Film Awards for Best Character Actor Award for Chakkara Muthu
2007 — Kerala State Film Award for Second Best Actor for Anandabhairavi
2015 — Asianet Film Award for Best Supporting Actor for Ennu Ninte Moideen
2008 — Filmfare Award for Best Supporting Actor – Malayalam for Anandabhairavi

Partial filmography

As an actor

As dubbing artist
Aagathan – voice for Sathyaraj
Thilakkam – voice for Thiagarajan
Kanal Kireedam – voice for Napolean
Karumadikuttan – voice for Suresh Krishna
Rakshasa Rajavu – voice for Suresh Krishna

Television serials
Neelaviriyitta Jalakam (Doordarshan)
Sathi (Dooradarshan)
Amma (Dooradarshan)
Vajram (Asianet)
Crime and Punishment (Asianet)
Silence (Asianet)
Snehadooram (Asianet)
Manthram (Surya TV)
Swantham (Asianet)
Kayamkulam Kochunni (surya TV)
Omanathinkal Pakshi (Asianet)
Sahadharmini (Asianet)
Srimahabhagavatham (Asianet)
Vishudha Thomasleeha (Asianet)
Pazhassiraaja (Asianet)
Jagratha (Amritha TV)
Vedanayude Viralppaadukal (Kairali TV)
Pournami Thinkal (Asianet)

References

External links
Saikumar to Divorce
Weblokam profile
http://en.msidb.org/displayProfile.php?category=actors&artist=Saikumar&limit=178

Male actors from Kerala
Male actors from Kollam
Living people
Kerala State Film Award winners
Male actors in Malayalam cinema
Indian male film actors
Filmfare Awards South winners
People from Kollam district
20th-century Indian male actors
21st-century Indian male actors
Indian male television actors
Male actors in Hindi television
Male actors in Telugu cinema
Male actors in Tamil cinema
1963 births